is a Japanese physicist notable for his work on quantum game theory and the foundations of quantum mechanics.

Education
He graduated from Kunitachi High School, in 1976. He obtained his BSc, 1980, his MSc, 1982, and PhD, under Akito Arima, 1985,
all from the University of Tokyo. His PhD thesis topic was in the area of theoretical nuclear physics.

Career
In 1985, he was a Yukawa Research Associate at Osaka University. In 1986, he was a Visiting Assistant Professor at the University of Georgia and in 1987 he was a research associate at the University of Maryland, College Park. In 1989, he was appointed as an INS Research Associate at the University of Tokyo. Presently he is Professor of Theoretical Physics at the Kochi University of Technology, Japan.

See also

Quantum Aspects of Life

External links
Cheon's math genealogy
Cheon's homepage

Living people
People from Tokyo
Japanese physicists
Quantum physicists
Academic staff of Osaka University
1958 births